Lecanora vinetorum is a rare species of crustose lichen in the family Lecanoraceae. Found in Central Europe, it was formally described as a new species in 1968 by lichenologists Josef Poelt and Siegfried Huneck. The type specimen was collected from the San Michele Appiano region of Trentino-Alto Adige (Bolzano Province); there it was found growing on vineyard frames. The species epithet vinetorum (Latin for "vineyard") refers to its habitat.

It is a member of the Lecanora varia species complex, which consists of about a dozen yellowish-green species that are related to L. varia. 

Although Lecanora lichens are typically saxicolous (rock-dwelling) species, L. vinetorum is remarkable for having adapted to growth on wood sprayed with copper-containing fungicides. This includes colonized trees (typically Prunus avium), and the sheltered tie-beams used in vineyard frames. Although the lichen is confined to small areas, it is locally abundant in habitats that do not have many other lichen species.

The compound griseoxanthone C was reported this species in 1992, the first time that substance had been reported from a lichen. It also contains the xanthone compound vinetorin.

See also
 List of Lecanora species

References

vinetorum
Lichens described in 1968
Lichen species
Lichens of Central Europe
Taxa named by Josef Poelt